Student Youth Network Inc., operating as SYN Media , is an Australian youth-run not-for-profit organisation providing media training and broadcasting opportunities for young people. Commonly referred to as SYN, the organisation produces new and independent media that is made by and for young people in Melbourne. Founded in 2000, today volunteers – all aged 12–25 years of age – produce a radio station broadcast on FM radio and DAB+ digital radio, as well as content for television, print and online. A 2006 McNair listener survey showed a similar age group, 15–24, as the largest age group listening to community radio in Australia.

History
SYN Media formed on 13 June 2000 as Student Youth Network Inc. as a merger of two student radio projects – 3TD, based at Thornbury-Darebin College, and RMIT University's Student Radio Association. A merger was to take place between 3TD, SRA, La Trobe University's SUB FM, Swinburne University's 3SSR, Monash University's 3MU and Deakin's BAS Radio as the Melbourne Student Radio consortium. However, talks broke down due to disagreements around giving high school students access to the station in less desirable timeslots and less board access, leading SRA general manager Jesse Nonneman to approach 3TD managers Colin Thompson and Paul Van Eeden about splitting away from the consortium.

The new organisation would be known as SAY-FM – Student And Youth FM – however, this was changed to SYN before the group's first meeting. With the aim of promoting young people as "creators not just consumers of media", funding was ensured through the Victorian Education Department, with the financial backing of then-Education Minister Mary Delahunty, and support from state minister Justin Madden and federal minister Martin Ferguson.

In 2001, the organisation secured one of four community radio licenses broadcasting to the Greater Melbourne area, alongside 3KND, JOY 94.9 and Triple Seven (now 89.9 LightFM), and on 28 January 2003 SYN FM launched, broadcasting on 90.7FM.

Also in 2003 was the organisation's first expansion into television. SYN TV would be the first programme in Australia to simulcast on radio (via SYN FM), television (via Channel 31) and stream online. Hosted entirely by under-18s, the programme would later be spun into two shows – the music-based 1700 on C31, and the under-18 focused Objection (now Amplify) on SYN 90.7. From February 2004, the organisation also operated the Pecado zine. The zine closed in December 2006.

In 2010, the organisation launched a revamped website, and in 2011 expanded its radio signal onto DAB+ digital radio. On 1 April 2014, SYN Nation was launched, exclusive to the DAB+ platform, featuring nationally focused content from partner community radio stations in Byron Bay, Canberra, Hobart, Gippsland, Warrnambool, Fitzroy Crossing and Fremantle.

On 16 April 2019, SYN Media announced that SYN Nation would merge with SYN 90.7 to create a single station, broadcasting on 90.7FM and DAB+ digital radio in Melbourne. The newly merged SYN commenced broadcasting on 22 April 2019.

Productions
SYN has three major production departments: SYN Radio, SYN TV, and SYN Online.

Radio

The organisation operates a radio station: SYN, broadcasting content created by young people aged 12–26 at SYN in Melbourne, as well as in various regional hubs partnered with community radio stations in Victoria, New South Wales, the Australian Capital Territory, Tasmania and Western Australia.

TV

As well as radio, SYN also produces television for Melbourne's community television broadcaster C31. At SYN TV's height in 2010, it produced up to 15 hours of content per week.

Launched in 2003, SYN TV's current flagship production for C31 is 1700, a live, hour-long youth music show airing weekdays. It features music videos, interviews, reviews and music related discussion.

In late 2008, SYN launched Get Cereal TV, a morning television alternative aimed at the youth of Melbourne. The show aired daily between 07:30 and 08:30 mornings on Channel 31. It was cancelled by SYN at the end of 2010 to allow the station to create alternative television programming.

2010 saw the premiere of The Wrap, a weekly live-to-air news entertainment programme that on Friday nights on C31 Melbourne. It ended after 3 seasons on air.

In early 2013, SYN launched The Cut, a weekly show based on arts and culture around Melbourne. It is SYN's only pre-recorded television show currently on air.

Online
Online, SYN publishes programme blogs and a weekly e-newsletter. The website also features "SYNcasts" of some of SYN's radio shows as well as various SYNcast-only programmes.

Contribution to community broadcasting
SYN is one of the largest youth projects in Australia and the world, and has up to 1500 volunteers. It defines its aim as "to implement a national culture of young people broadcasting for themselves". In order to achieve this outcome, the station rotates on-air presenters frequently (approximately every three months) and all crew and executive positions annually. SYN does this to allow more than 1200 young people to gain direct media experience annually. Around 2500 students have also incorporated SYN's training and education programmes into their studies.

SYN has contributed greatly to community radio both in Australia and worldwide. For example, one spinoff project, the Bentokit Project, is a FLOSS and cross-platform radio broadcasting suite for community stations licensed under the GPL.

On 25 November 2011, a book was released entitled Life of SYN written by Ellie Rennie. In it, Rennie follows key SYN staff and volunteers "as they build Australia's most unusual media empire against enormous odds. Over the course of the book, social networking becomes the most popular use of the internet and traditional media institutions are forced to acknowledge the rise of amateur content. In response, SYN rethinks its approach to the online environment, kills its print publication, deals with the introduction of digital broadcasting and teaches schoolteachers about a new kind of literacy. In just two years dozens of careers are launched, the SYN radio audience doubles and they get told off for swearing."

Slogan
SYN has had several different slogans. The most recent slogan is "Click, Switch, Watch" and was intended to reflect SYN's three media platforms – online, radio and television. Past slogans include "Creators not Consumers", "We May Be Young But We Know Our Shit" and "Where the Kids Push the Buttons". The circle logo was developed in the mid-1990s by Caroline Worsley. The launch creative, featuring an evolution narrative, was originally designed by Olivia Fowler studying a diploma of graphic design at Holmesglen TAFE, her iconic baby in the ear, representing the birth of a radio station was developed into series of posters by Jeremy Wortsman.

Notable alumni
Former SYN presenters include Australian media personalities Hamish and Andy, Ryan Shelton, The Barefoot Investor Scott Pape, triple j presenters Zan Rowe, Bridget Hustwaite and Nat Tencic. Nova 100's Mel Tracina as well as comedians Tom & Olly.

See also
 Works in Theory, was a radio program on SYN Radio

References

External links
 SYN's official website

 
RMIT University
Organisations based in Melbourne
2000 establishments in Australia
Organizations established in 2000
Mass media companies established in 2000